was a Japanese scholar of the early to mid 20th century. A direct descendant of the famed Katakura Kagetsuna, Nobumitsu was a scholar of regional history, focusing on Sendai. Nobumitsu would have been the sixteenth Katakura Kojūrō.

External links
Katakura family tree (in Japanese)

Kazoku
Japanese writers
People from Miyagi Prefecture
Katakura clan
Year of birth missing
Year of death missing